Brezovo is a small settlement in the Sava Hills in the Municipality of Sevnica in central Slovenia. The area is part of the historical region of Styria. The municipality is now included in the Lower Sava Statistical Region.

References

External links
Brezovo at Geopedia

Populated places in the Municipality of Sevnica